Beltes River is a river in the Khövsgöl aimag of Mongolia.

It starts in the Renchinlkhümbe sum in the south-western range of the Khoridol Saridag mountains, about 40 km north-west of Khatgal.
It ends by entering the Delger mörön in Bayanzürkh sum, shortly after passing the sum center Altraga.

References

See also
List of rivers of Mongolia

Rivers of Mongolia